The Fort Madison High School (FMHS) is located in Fort Madison, Iowa. As the only high school of the Fort Madison Community School District, it serves Fort Madison, Houghton, St. Paul, and West Point. It also serves the unincorporated area of Denmark.

Athletics 
The Bloodhounds compete in the Southeast Conference in the following sports:

Baseball
 2000 Class 3A State Champions 
Basketball 
Cross Country 
 Boys' 2-time State Champions (11925, 1926)
 Girls' 1979 Class 3A State Champions
Football
Golf 
Soccer 
Softball 
Tennis 
Track and Field 
Volleyball
Wrestling

See also
List of high schools in Iowa

References

Public high schools in Iowa
Schools in Lee County, Iowa
Buildings and structures in Fort Madison, Iowa